Loveholic is a 2005 South Korean television series starring Kangta, Kim Gyu-ri, Lee Sun-kyun and Yoo In-young. It aired on KBS2 from May 2 to June 21, 2005 on Mondays and Tuesdays at 21:55 for 16 episodes.

Plot
In a high school in Chuncheon, a rebellious, disobedient student named Seo Kang-wook meets a young and naive teacher Lee Yeol-joo, and despite everything, they fall in love.

Initially, Yeol-joo paid a lot of attention to Kang-wook, recognizing his inherent intelligence and talent and hoping to steer him to the good path. This attention later coalesced into attraction and then love, grudgingly admitted. Yeol-joo herself was in an apparently steady relationship with a promising police inspector, Kim Tae-hyun, who cares for her a whole lot more than she does in return.

A narcoleptic, Yeol-joo accidentally kills one of Kang-wook's friends, but she passes out and remembers nothing. To protect her, Kang-wook takes the blame and goes to jail, but not before convincing Yeol-joo that her memory of killing the man was just an episode of narcoleptic hallucination.

Five years later, Kang-wook finishes his sentence, but Yeol-joo is now engaged to Tae-hyun. Still unaware that she is the real killer, both Kang-wook and Tae-hyun work together to protect her from the truth. Later learning what sacrifice he has made for her, Yeol-joo wants to return to Kang-wook, but this time Kang-wook is not alone—Ja-kyung, his former classmate and currently a radio program host, is beside him. The circumstances hamper Yeol-joo from loving Kang-wook, but she is desperate to help him recover the lost five years and become a top-notch cook.

Cast

Main cast
Kangta as Seo Kang-wook
Kim Gyu-ri as Lee Yeol-joo
Lee Sun-kyun as Kim Tae-hyun
Yoo In-young as Yoon Ja-kyung

Supporting cast
Kang In-hyung as Jung Ho-tae
Jung Hye-sun as Jo In-ja (Kang-wook's grandmother) 
Yang Geum-seok as Park Soo-jin (Tae-hyun's mother)
Jung Dong-hwan as Kim Soo-bong (Tae-hyun's father)
Lee Hye-sook as Im Young-ae (Yeol-joo's mother)
Lee Kyung-pyo as Cha Hwa-young (Ja-kyung's mother)
Park Hyo-jun as Park Kyung-oh
Jung Eun-pyo as Han Young-gil
Kim Hee-chul as Joo Ho (Bit part appearance)

Notes

References

External links
 Loveholic official KBS website 
 

Korean Broadcasting System television dramas
2005 South Korean television series debuts
2005 South Korean television series endings
South Korean romance television series
South Korean melodrama television series